WKU Public Radio is the public radio service of Western Kentucky University in Bowling Green, Kentucky.  It is a division of the Department of Information Technology at WKU.  The network consists of four FM radio stations and one FM translator.  Combined, the stations cover most of Western Kentucky and parts of Indiana and Tennessee, reaching into the northern suburbs of Nashville.

History
WKYU-FM signed on for the first time in November 1980 as the first public radio station for south central Kentucky. The station was spearheaded by Dr. Chuck Anderson, who had experimented with a carrier current station on-campus at WKU since 1975. 

Over the next ten years, WKYU would expand its coverage through three satellite stations. WDCL-FM signed-on in 1985 to serve areas around Somerset and Campbellsville from a tower in Adair County. WDCL obtained its calls from longtime public radio supporter Daniel Cole. 1990 would see the other two stations join the network: WKUE-FM in Elizabethtown and WKPB for the Ohio River communities of Henderson and Owensboro.

Until August 2009, the network was known as Western's Public Radio, airing mostly classical music during the day. However, on August 31, it rebranded itself as WKU Public Radio, and began airing mostly news and talk during the day. Prior to Western Public Radio's sign-on, the only portion of the coverage area that had a clear signal from an NPR station was Henderson and Owensboro, which received NPR programming from WNIN-FM in Evansville.

In 2016, WKYU-FM signed on a new service on a new FM translator station, W248CF. That translator airs classical music 24 hours a day. Since its signal does not reach too far outside of Warren County, it is repeated on WKYU-FM's second HD channel, and also streams live on the Internet.

Programming
WKU Public Radio airs news and informational programming on weekdays, with classical music heard at night.  Weekends feature informational shows by day, with jazz on Saturday nights and specialty music programs Sunday evenings.  Saturdays and Sundays at noon, Erika Brady hosts the "Barren River Breakdown" show.  WKUE is an affiliate of National Public Radio, with shows from American Public Media and the Public Radio Exchange also heard.

Stations
The network consists of four full-power stations and two FM translators, all located in Kentucky and simulcasting the same programming at all times. Together, the five main stations reach 65% of Kentucky, including the fringes of the Louisville and Lexington areas.  The stations also serve portions of Indiana, Illinois and Tennessee.  Much of this area is composed of rural areas and small towns; Evansville, Indiana is by far the largest city in the region.

References

External links
wkyufm.org

Radio stations in Kentucky
Western Kentucky University
NPR member networks